Żukowo may refer to the following places:
Żukowo, Płock County in Masovian Voivodeship (east-central Poland)
Żukowo, Płońsk County in Masovian Voivodeship (east-central Poland)
Żukowo in Pomeranian Voivodeship (north Poland)
Żukowo, Greater Poland Voivodeship (west-central Poland)
Żukowo, Chojnice County in Pomeranian Voivodeship (north Poland)
Żukowo, Człuchów County in Pomeranian Voivodeship (north Poland)
Żukowo, Gryfice County in West Pomeranian Voivodeship (north-west Poland)
Żukowo, Sławno County in West Pomeranian Voivodeship (north-west Poland)
Żukowo, Stargard County in West Pomeranian Voivodeship (north-west Poland)